The Colonial Apartments are two historic apartment buildings located at 406 Walnut St. in Carthage, Jasper County, Missouri.  They were designed by Neville, Sharpe, and Simon in the Colonial Revival style and built in 1948 by the B&G Construction Group.  They are two-story, red brick building designated Building A and Building B. They have low-pitched hipped roofs with segmental arched dormers. 

The complex was listed on the National Register of Historic Places in 2001.

References

Residential buildings on the National Register of Historic Places in Missouri
Colonial Revival architecture in Missouri
Residential buildings completed in 1948
Buildings and structures in Jasper County, Missouri
National Register of Historic Places in Jasper County, Missouri